Hasselgren is a Swedish surname. Notable people with the surname include:

Albinus Hasselgren (1880–1916) (born Johan Albin Hasselgren), Swedish-born American artist
Ragnar Hasselgren (1904–1982), Swedish-born American singer and recording artist

Swedish-language surnames